1994 Sanfrecce Hiroshima season

Review and events
Sanfrecce Hiroshima won J.League Suntory series (first stage).

League results summary

League results by round

Competitions

Domestic results

J.League

Suntory series

NICOS series

J.League Championship

Emperor's Cup

J.League Cup

Player statistics

 † player(s) joined the team after the opening of this season.

Transfers

In:

Out:

Transfers during the season

In
Tore (on August)
Kazuyori Mochizuki (from Sanfrecce Hiroshima GK coach)

Out

Awards
J.League Best XI: Takuya Takagi

Notes

References

Other pages
 J. League official site
 Sanfrecce Hiroshima official site

Sanfrecce Hiroshima
Sanfrecce Hiroshima seasons